Hypertrophic cardiomyopathy (HCM, or HOCM when obstructive) is a condition in which the heart becomes thickened without an obvious cause. The parts of the heart most commonly affected are the interventricular septum and the ventricles.  This results in the heart being less able to pump blood effectively and also may cause electrical conduction problems.

People who have HCM may have a range of symptoms.  People may be asymptomatic, or may have fatigue, leg swelling, and shortness of breath. It may also result in chest pain or fainting. Symptoms may be worse when the person is dehydrated.  Complications may include heart failure, an irregular heartbeat, and sudden cardiac death.

HCM is most commonly inherited in an autosomal dominant pattern. It is often due to mutations in certain genes involved with making heart muscle proteins. Other inherited causes of left ventricular hypertrophy may include Fabry disease, Friedreich's ataxia, and certain medications such as tacrolimus. Other considerations for causes of enlarged heart are athlete's heart and hypertension (high blood pressure). Making the diagnosis of HCM often involves a family history or pedigree, an electrocardiogram, echocardiogram, and stress testing. Genetic testing may also be done. HCM can be distinguished from other inherited causes of cardiomyopathy by its autosomal dominant pattern, whereas Fabry disease is X-linked, and Friedreich's ataxia is inherited in an autosomal recessive pattern.

Treatment may depend on symptoms and other risk factors.  Medications may include the use of beta blockers, verapamil or disopyramide. An implantable cardiac defibrillator may be recommended in those with certain types of irregular heartbeat. Surgery, in the form of a septal myectomy or heart transplant, may be done in those who do not improve with other measures. With treatment, the risk of death from the disease is less than one percent per year.

HCM affects up to one in 200 people. Rates in men and women are about equal. People of all ages may be affected. The first modern description of the disease was by Donald Teare in 1958.

Signs and symptoms 

Many people are asymptomatic or mildly symptomatic, and many of those carrying disease genes for HCM do not have clinically detectable disease. The symptoms of HCM include shortness of breath due to stiffening and decreased blood filling of the ventricles, exertional chest pain (sometimes known as angina) due to reduced blood flow to the coronary arteries, uncomfortable awareness of the heart beat (palpitations), as well as disruption of the electrical system running through the abnormal heart muscle, lightheadedness, weakness, fainting and sudden cardiac death.

Shortness of breath is largely due to increased thickness of the left ventricle (LV), which impairs filling of the ventricles, but also leads to elevated pressure in the left ventricle and left atrium as a result of increased thickness involving the inter ventricular septum obstructing the left ventricular outflow, causing back pressure and interstitial congestion in the lungs. Symptoms are not closely related to the presence or severity of an outflow tract gradient. Often, symptoms mimic those of congestive heart failure (esp. activity intolerance and dyspnea), but treatment of each is different. Beta blockers are used in both cases, but treatment with diuretics, a mainstay of CHF treatment, will exacerbate symptoms in hypertrophic obstructive cardiomyopathy by decreasing ventricular preload volume and thereby increasing outflow resistance (less blood to push aside the thickened obstructing tissue).

Major risk factors for sudden death in individuals with HCM include prior history of cardiac arrest or ventricular fibrillation, spontaneous sustained ventricular tachycardia, abnormal exercise blood pressure and non-sustained ventricular tachycardia, unexplained syncope, family history of premature sudden death, and LVW thickness greater than 15 mm to 30 mm, on echocardiogram.

"Spike and dome" pulse and "triple ripple apical impulse" are two other signs that can be discovered in physical examination.

Genetics

Familial hypertrophic cardiomyopathy is inherited as an autosomal dominant trait and is attributed to mutations in one of a number of genes that encode for the sarcomere proteins.

Currently, about 50–60% of people with a high index of clinical suspicion for HCM will have a mutation identified in at least one of nine sarcomeric genes. Approximately 40% of these mutations occur in the β-myosin heavy chain gene on chromosome 14 q11.2-3, and approximately 40% involve the cardiac myosin-binding protein C gene. Since HCM is typically an autosomal dominant trait, children of a single HCM parent have 50% chance of inheriting the disease-causing mutation. Whenever such a mutation is identified, family-specific genetic testing can be used to identify relatives at-risk for the disease, although clinical severity and age of onset cannot be predicted.An insertion/deletion polymorphism in the gene encoding for angiotensin converting enzyme (ACE) alters the clinical phenotype of the disease. The D/D (deletion/deletion) genotype of ACE is associated with more marked hypertrophy of the left ventricle and may be associated with higher risk of adverse outcomes.

Some mutations could have more harmful potential compared to others (β-myosin heavy chain). For example, troponin T mutations were originally associated with a 50% mortality before the age of 40. However, a more recent and larger study found a similar risk to other sarcomeric protein mutations. The age at disease onset of HCM with MYH7 is earlier and leads to more severe symptoms. Moreover, mutations on troponin C can alter Ca+2 sensibility on force development in cardiac muscle, these mutations are named after the amino acid that was changed after the location in which it happened, such as A8V, A31S, C84Y and D145E.

Diagnosis 

A diagnosis of hypertrophic cardiomyopathy is based upon a number of features of the disease process. While there is use of echocardiography, cardiac catheterization, or cardiac MRI in the diagnosis of the disease, other important considerations include ECG, genetic testing (although not primarily used for diagnosis), and any family history of HCM or unexplained sudden death in otherwise healthy individuals.
In about 60 to 70% of the cases, cardiac MRI shows thickening of more than 15 mm of the lower part of the ventricular septum. T1-weighted imaging may identify scarring of cardiac tissues while T2-weighted imaging may identify oedema and inflammation of cardiac tissue which is associated with acute clinical signs of chest pain and fainting episodes.

Pulsus bisferiens may occasional be found during examination.

Variants 
Depending on whether the distortion of normal heart anatomy causes an obstruction of the outflow of blood from the left ventricle of the heart, HCM can be classified as obstructive or non-obstructive. The obstructive variant of HCM is hypertrophic obstructive cardiomyopathy (HOCM), also historically known as idiopathic hypertrophic subaortic stenosis(IHSS) or asymmetric septal hypertrophy (ASH).  The diagnosis of left ventricular outflow tract obstruction is usually made by echocardiographic assessment and is defined as a peak left ventricular outflow tract gradient of ≥ 30 mmHg.

Another, non-obstructive variant of HCM is apical hypertrophic cardiomyopathy (AHC), also called Yamaguchi syndrome. It was first described in individuals of Japanese descent.

Cardiac catheterization

Upon cardiac catheterization, catheters can be placed in the left ventricle and the ascending aorta, to measure the pressure difference between these structures. In normal individuals, during ventricular systole, the pressure in the ascending aorta and the left ventricle will equalize, and the aortic valve is open. In individuals with aortic stenosis or with HCM with an outflow tract gradient, there will be a pressure gradient (difference) between the left ventricle and the aorta, with the left ventricular pressure higher than the aortic pressure. This gradient represents the degree of obstruction that has to be overcome in order to eject blood from the left ventricle.

The Brockenbrough–Braunwald–Morrow sign is observed in individuals with HCM with outflow tract gradient. This sign can be used to differentiate HCM from aortic stenosis. In individuals with aortic stenosis, after a premature ventricular contraction (PVC), the following ventricular contraction will be more forceful, and the pressure generated in the left ventricle will be higher. Because of the fixed obstruction that the stenotic aortic valve represents, the post-PVC ascending aortic pressure will increase as well. In individuals with HCM, however, the degree of obstruction will increase more than the force of contraction will increase in the post-PVC beat. The result of this is that the left ventricular pressure increases and the ascending aortic pressure decreases, with an increase in the LVOT gradient.

While the Brockenbrough–Braunwald–Morrow sign is most dramatically demonstrated using simultaneous intra-cardiac and intra-aortic catheters, it can be seen on routine physical examination as a decrease in the pulse pressure in the post-PVC beat in individuals with HCM.

Screening 

Although HCM may be asymptomatic, affected individuals may present with symptoms ranging from mild to critical heart failure and sudden cardiac death at any point from early childhood to seniority. HCM is the leading cause of sudden cardiac death in young athletes in the United States, and the most common genetic cardiovascular disorder. One study found that the incidence of sudden cardiac death in young competitive athletes declined in the Veneto region of Italy by 89% since the 1982 introduction of routine cardiac screening for athletes, from an unusually high starting rate. As of 2010, however, studies have shown that the incidence of sudden cardiac death, among all people with HCM, has declined to one percent or less. Screen-positive individuals who are diagnosed with cardiac disease are usually told to avoid competitive athletics.

HCM can be detected with an echocardiogram (ECHO) with 80%+ accuracy, which can be preceded by screening with an electrocardiogram (ECG) to test for heart abnormalities. Cardiac magnetic resonance imaging (CMR), considered the gold standard for determining the physical properties of the left ventricular wall, can serve as an alternative screening tool when an echocardiogram provides inconclusive results. For example, the identification of segmental lateral ventricular hypertrophy cannot be accomplished with echocardiography alone. Also, left ventricular hypertrophy may be absent in children under thirteen years of age. This undermines the results of pre-adolescents' echocardiograms.  Researchers, however, have studied asymptomatic carriers of an HCM-causing mutation through the use of CMR and have been able to identify crypts in the interventricular septal tissue in these people. It has been proposed that the formation of these crypts is an indication of myocyte disarray and altered vessel walls that may later result in the clinical expression of HCM. A possible explanation for this is that the typical gathering of family history only focuses on whether sudden death occurred or not. It fails to acknowledge the age at which relatives had had sudden cardiac death, as well as the frequency of the cardiac events. Furthermore, given the several factors necessary to be considered at risk for sudden cardiac death, while most of the factors do not have strong predictive value individually, there exists ambiguity regarding when to implement special treatment.

United States 
There are several potential challenges associated with routine screening for HCM in the United States. First, the U.S. athlete population of 15 million is almost twice as large as Italy's estimated athlete population. Second, these events are rare, with fewer than 100 deaths in the U.S. due to HCM in competitive athletes per year, or about 1 death per 220,000 athletes. Lastly, genetic testing would provide a definitive diagnosis; however, due to the numerous HCM-causing mutations, this method of screening is complex and is not cost-effective. Therefore, genetic testing in the United States is limited to individuals who exhibit clear symptoms of HCM, and their family members. This ensures that the test is not wasted on detecting other causes of ventricular hypertrophy (due to its low sensitivity), and that family members of the individual are educated on the potential risk of being carriers of the mutant gene(s).

Canada 
Canadian genetic testing guidelines and recommendations for individuals diagnosed with HCM are as follows:
 The main purpose of genetic testing is for screening family members.
 According to the results, at-risk relatives may be encouraged to undergo extensive testing.
 Genetic testing is not meant for confirming a diagnosis.
 If the diagnosed individual has no relatives that are at risk, then genetic testing is not required.
 Genetic testing is not intended for risk assessment or treatment decisions.
 Evidence only supports clinical testing in predicting the progression and risk of developing complications of HCM.

For individuals suspected of having HCM:
 Genetic testing is not recommended for determining other causes of left ventricular hypertrophy (such as "athlete's heart", hypertension, and cardiac amyloidosis).
 HCM may be differentiated from other hypertrophy-causing conditions using clinical history and clinical testing.

Treatment

Asymptomatic people
A significant number of people with hypertrophic cardiomyopathy do not have any symptoms and will have a normal life expectancy, although they should avoid particularly strenuous activities or competitive athletics.  Asymptomatic people should be screened for risk factors for sudden cardiac death.  In people with resting or inducible outflow obstructions, situations that will cause dehydration or vasodilation (such as the use of vasodilatory or diuretic blood pressure medications) should be avoided.  Septal reduction therapy is not recommended in asymptomatic people.

Medications
The primary goal of medications is to relieve symptoms such as chest pain, shortness of breath, and palpitations. Beta blockers are considered first-line agents, as they can slow down the heart rate and decrease the likelihood of ectopic beats.  For people who cannot tolerate beta blockers, nondihydropyridine calcium channel blockers such as verapamil can be used, but are potentially harmful in people who also have low blood pressure or severe shortness of breath at rest. These medications also decrease the heart rate, though their use in people with severe outflow obstruction, elevated pulmonary artery wedge pressure, and low blood pressures should be done with caution.  Dihydropyridine calcium channel blockers should be avoided in people with evidence of obstruction. For people whose symptoms are not relieved by the above treatments, disopyramide can be considered for further symptom relief.  Diuretics can be considered for people with evidence of fluid overload, though cautiously used in those with evidence of obstruction. People who continue to have symptoms despite drug therapy can consider more invasive therapies. Intravenous phenylephrine (or another pure vasoconstricting agent) can be used in the acute setting of low blood pressure in those with obstructive hypertrophic cardiomyopathy who do not respond to fluid administration.

Mavacamten was approved for medical use in the United States in April 2022.

Surgical septal myectomy

Surgical septal myectomy is an open-heart operation done to relieve symptoms in people who remain severely symptomatic despite medical therapy. It has been performed successfully since the early 1960s. Surgical septal myectomy uniformly decreases left ventricular outflow tract obstruction and improves symptoms, and in experienced centers has a surgical mortality of less than 1%, as well as 85% success rate.  It involves a median sternotomy (general anesthesia, opening the chest, and cardiopulmonary bypass) and removing a portion of the interventricular septum. Surgical myectomy resection that focuses just on the subaortic septum, to increase the size of the outflow tract to reduce Venturi forces, may be inadequate to abolish systolic anterior motion (SAM) of the anterior leaflet of the mitral valve. With this limited resection, the residual mid-septal bulge still redirects flow posteriorly; SAM persists because flow still gets behind the mitral valve. It is only when the deeper portion of the septal bulge is resected that flow is redirected anteriorly away from the mitral valve, abolishing SAM. With this in mind, a modification of the Morrow myectomy termed extended myectomy, mobilization and partial excision of the papillary muscles has become the excision of choice. In people with particularly large redundant mitral valves, anterior leaflet plication may be added to complete separation of the mitral valve and outflow. Complications of septal myectomy surgery include possible death, arrhythmias, infection, incessant bleeding, septal perforation/defect, and stroke.

Alcohol septal ablation

Alcohol septal ablation, introduced by Ulrich Sigwart in 1994, is a percutaneous technique that involves injection of alcohol into one or more septal branches of the left anterior descending artery. This is a catheter technique with results similar to the surgical septal myectomy procedure but is less invasive, since it does not involve general anaesthesia and opening of the chest wall and pericardium (which are done in a septal myectomy). In a select population with symptoms secondary to a high outflow tract gradient, alcohol septal ablation can reduce the symptoms of HCM.  In addition, older individuals and those with other medical problems, for whom surgical myectomy would pose increased procedural risk, would likely benefit from the less-invasive septal ablation procedure.

When performed properly, an alcohol septal ablation induces a controlled heart attack, in which the portion of the interventricular septum that involves the left ventricular outflow tract is infarcted and will contract into a scar.  There is debate over which people are best served by surgical myectomy, alcohol septal ablation, or medical therapy.

Mitral clip

Since 2013, mitral clips have been implanted via catheter as a new strategy to correct the motion of the mitral valve in people with severe obstructive HCM. The device fastens together the mitral valve leaflets to improve the heart's blood outflow. The mitral clip has not yet established the long-term reliability of septal myectomy or alcohol septal ablation, but HCM specialists are increasingly offering the clip as a less-invasive treatment option.

Implantable pacemaker or defibrillator

The use of a pacemaker has been advocated in a subset of individuals, in order to cause asynchronous contraction of the left ventricle. Since the pacemaker activates the interventricular septum before the left ventricular free wall, the gradient across the left ventricular outflow tract may decrease. This form of treatment has been shown to provide less relief of symptoms and less of a reduction in the left ventricular outflow tract gradient when compared to surgical myectomy. Technological advancements have also led to the development of a dual-chamber pacemaker, which is only turned on when needed (in contrast to a regular pacemaker which provides a constant stimulus). Although the dual-chamber pacemaker has shown to decrease ventricular outflow tract obstruction, experimental trials have found only a few individuals with improved symptoms. Researchers suspect that these reports of improved symptoms are due to a placebo effect.

The procedure includes an incision on the anterolateral area below the clavicle. Two leads are then inserted; one into the right atrium and the other into the right ventricular apex via the subclavian veins. Once in place, they are secured and attached to the generator which will remain inside the fascia, anterior to the pectoral muscle. Complications of this procedure include infection, electrical lead and generator malfunction which will require replacement.

For people with HCM who exhibit one or more of the major risk factors for sudden cardiac death, an implantable cardioverter-defibrillator (ICD) or a combination pacemaker/ICD all-in-one unit may be recommended as an appropriate precaution. In 2014, European Society of Cardiology suggested a practical risk score to calculate that risk.

Cardiac transplantation

In cases that are unresponsive to all other forms of treatment, cardiac transplantation is one option. It is also the only treatment available for end-stage heart failure. However, transplantation must occur before the onset of symptoms such as pulmonary vessel hypertension, kidney malfunction, and thromboembolism in order for it to be successful. Studies have indicated a seven-year survival rate of 94% in people with HCM after transplantation.

Prognosis
A systematic review from 2002 concluded that: "Overall, HCM confers an annual mortality rate of about 1%... HCM may be associated with important symptoms and premature death but more frequently with no or relatively mild disability and normal life expectancy."

Children
Even though hypertrophic cardiomyopathy (HCM) may be present early in life and is most likely congenital, it is one of the most-uncommon cardiac malformations encountered in pediatric cardiology, largely because the presentation of symptoms is usually absent, incomplete, or delayed into adulthood. Most of the current information pertaining to HCM arises from studies in adult populations, and the implication of these observations for pediatric population is often uncertain. Nonetheless, recent studies in pediatric cardiology have revealed that HCM accounts for 42% of childhood cardiomyopathies, with an annual incidence rate of 0.47/100,000 in children. Further, in asymptomatic cases, sudden death is considered one of the most-feared complications associated with the disease in select pediatric populations. Consequently, the recommended practice is to screen children of affected individuals throughout childhood to detect cardiac abnormalities at an early stage, in the hope of preventing further complications of the disease.

Generally, the diagnosis of HCM in a pediatric population is made during assessment for murmur, congestive heart failure, physical exhaustion, and genetic testing of children of affected individuals. Specifically, echocardiogram (ECHO) has been used as a definitive noninvasive diagnostic tool in nearly all children.  ECHO assesses cardiac ventricular size, wall thickness, systolic and diastolic function, and outflow obstruction. Thus, ECHO has been chosen as an ideal means to detect excessive wall thickening of cardiac muscle in HCM.

For children with HCM, treatment strategies aim to reduce disease symptoms and lower the risk of sudden death. Due to the heterogeneity of the disease, treatment is usually modified according to individual's needs. β-blockers improve left ventricular filling and relaxation and thereby  lessen symptoms. In some children, β–blockers (e.g., propranolol) were shown effective to reduce the risk of sudden death. Further, calcium channel blockers (verapamil) and antiarrhythmic drugs may be used as an adjunct therapy to β-blockers in symptomatic children. Nonetheless, further testing is needed to determine their definitive benefits.

Other animals

Cats 
Feline hypertrophic cardiomyopathy (HCM) is the most common heart disease in domestic cats; the disease process and genetics are believed to be similar to the disease in humans. In Maine Coon cats, HCM has been confirmed as an autosomal dominant inherited trait. Numerous cat breeds have HCM as a problem in the breed. The first genetic mutation (in cardiac myosin binding protein C) responsible for feline HCM was discovered in 2005 in Maine Coon cats. A test for this mutation (A31P) is available. About one-third of Maine Coon cats tested for the mutation are either heterozygous or homozygous for the mutation, although many of the cats that are heterozygous have no overt evidence of the disease on an echocardiogram (low penetrance). Some Maine Coon cats with clinical evidence of hypertrophic cardiomyopathy test negative for this mutation, strongly suggesting that another cause exists in the breed. The cardiac myosin binding protein C mutation identified in Maine Coon cats has not been found in any other breed of cat with HCM, but more recently another myosin binding protein C mutation has been identified in Ragdoll cats with HCM. As in humans, feline HCM is not present at birth but develops over time. It has been identified for the first time in cats as young as 6 months of age and at least as old as 7 years of age.

Clinically, cats with hypertrophic cardiomyopathy commonly have a systolic anterior motion (SAM) of the mitral valve (see graphic). Cats with severe HCM often develop left heart failure (pulmonary edema; pleural effusion) because of severe diastolic dysfunction of the left ventricle. They may also develop a left atrial thrombus that embolizes, most commonly, to the terminal aorta creating acute pain and rear limb paralysis (see below). Sudden death can also occur but appears to be uncommon.

Ultrasound of the heart (echocardiography) is necessary to diagnose HCM in cats. Measurement of circulating cardiac biomarkers, like N‐terminal‐proBNP (NT‐proBNP) and troponin I (TnI) may be used in cats to strengthen the suspicion of cardiac disease. There is a Point-of-care test for feline NT-proBNP available which can be used at the veterinary clinic when echocardiography is not possible to perform.

There is no cure for feline HCM. Many but not all cats have a heart murmur. Many cats that have a heart murmur do not have HCM. Frequently the first signs that a cat has HCM are tachypnea/dyspnea due to heart failure or acute pain and paralysis due to systemic thromboembolism. While medication is commonly given to cats with HCM that have no clinical signs, no medication has been shown to be helpful at this stage and it has been shown that an ACE inhibitor is not beneficial until heart failure is present (at which time a diuretic is most beneficial). Diltiazem generally produces no demonstrable benefit. Atenolol is commonly administered when a severe systolic anterior motion of the mitral valve is present.

Feline arterial thromboembolism (FATE) is a relatively common and devastating complication of feline HCM and other feline cardiomyopathies. The thrombus generally forms in the left atrium, most commonly the left auricle. The formation is thought to be primarily due to blood flow stasis. Classically, the thromboembolism lodges at the iliac trifurcation of the aorta, occluding either one or both of the common iliac arteries. Because this split is called the saddle, and is the most frequent location for the thrombus, FATE is commonly known as saddle thrombus. Clinically this presents as a cat with complete loss of function in one or both hind limbs. The hind limbs are cold and the cat is in considerable pain. Emboli may, rarely, lodge in other locations, most commonly the right front limb and the renal arteries.

Clopidogrel is used to try to prevent left atrial thrombus formation in cats with HCM and a large left atrium. The FATCAT study at Purdue University demonstrated that it is superior to aspirin for the prevention of a second thrombus from forming in cats that have already experienced a clot. Thrombolytic agents (e.g., tissue plasminogen activator) have been used with some success to break down an existing aortic thromboembolism, but their cost is high and outcome appears to be no better than giving a cat time (48–72 hours) to break down its own clot. Pain management is extremely important. The prognosis for cats with FATE is often poor as they are likely to have significant HCM already and a recurrent bout of FATE is likely. For this reason, euthanasia is often a valid consideration.

Gorillas 
In July 2013, Rigo, a 42-year-old western lowland gorilla, resident in Melbourne Zoo and father of Mzuri, the first gorilla born by artificial insemination, died unexpectedly as a result of HCM. The condition is not uncommon in male gorillas over the age of 30, and in many cases, there is no sign of the disease until the individual's sudden death.

References

External links 

 
  GeneReviews/NIH/NCBI/UW entry on Familial Hypertrophic Cardiomyopathy Overview
 National Heart, Blood, and Lung Institute Cardiomyopathy Page

Cardiomyopathy
Autosomal dominant disorders
Cardiogenetic disorders
Cat diseases
Cytoskeletal defects
Sports medicine
Articles containing video clips
Wikipedia medicine articles ready to translate